The UNLV Runnin' Rebels basketball statistical leaders are individual statistical leaders of the UNLV Runnin' Rebels basketball program in various categories, including points, assists, blocks, rebounds, and steals. Within those areas, the lists identify single-game, single-season, and career leaders. The Runnin' Rebels represent the University of Nevada, Las Vegas in the NCAA's Mountain West Conference.

UNLV began competing in intercollegiate basketball in 1958.  The NCAA did not officially record assists as a stat until the 1983–84 season, and blocks and steals until the 1985–86 season, but UNLV's record books includes players in these stats before these seasons. These lists are updated through the end of the 2021–22 season.

Scoring

Rebounds

Assists

Steals

Blocks

References

Lists of college basketball statistical leaders by team
Statistical
Nevada sports-related lists